Anatoly Alekseyevich Dobryakov (23 February 1939 – 12 May 2003), was a Russian politician who had served as the 1st Head of Administration (governor) of Pskov Oblast from 1991 to 1992.

He died on 12 May 2003.

Biography

Anatoly Dobryakov was born on 23 February 1939. 

He graduated from the Borovichi Automobile and Road Technical School. From 1957 he worked as an auto mechanic, senior mechanic, engineer, chief engineer at the transport enterprises of the Kustanai region, then - the head of a number of transport enterprises in the Sverdlovsk region, and was a deputy general director of the Nizhniy Tagil industrial association of freight vehicles "Uralchimplast".

In 1988, he moved to Pskov. He headed the engineering service of the communal services department of the Pskov city executive committee of the Council of People's Deputies, and in 1989, he had become the general director of the Pskovnefteprodukt association of companies (a branch of Surgutneftegaz).

On 24 October 1991, by the Decree of the President of Russia, No. 154, Dobyrakov was appointed the 1st Governor (Head) of the Pskov Oblast.

On 5 May 1992, Dobryakov was removed from office, and Vladislav Tumanov was appointed to his place.

He died on 12 May 2003.

References

1939 births
2003 deaths
Governors of Pskov Oblast
People from Novgorod Oblast